The 2009 EAP Under-19 Cricket Trophy was a cricket tournament organised by the EAP for Under-19 teams from its member nations. The event also served as qualification for the 2009 Under-19 World Cup Qualifier. Five teams took part in the tournament, which was held from 30 May-8 June in Port Moresby, Papua New Guinea. Papua New Guinea, won the tournament with runner-up Vanuatu joining them in qualification.

Teams

Matches

The teams played one another on a round-robin basis. The teams were then ranked based on number of wins.

Results

References
 East Asia-Pacific Under-19 Championship 2009 at CricketArchive

Under-19 regional cricket tournaments
International cricket competitions in 2009
2009 in Papua New Guinean sport
International sports competitions hosted by Papua New Guinea
International cricket competitions in Papua New Guinea